The 1980 Penn State Nittany Lions football team represented the Pennsylvania State University in the 1980 NCAA Division I-A football season. The team was coached by Joe Paterno and played its home games in Beaver Stadium in University Park, Pennsylvania.

Schedule

Roster

Game summaries

Nebraska

Syracuse

vs. Ohio State (Fiesta Bowl)

NFL Draft
Seven Nittany Lions were drafted in the 1981 NFL Draft.

References

Penn State
Penn State Nittany Lions football seasons
Fiesta Bowl champion seasons
Penn State Nittany Lions football